Spider's Web is a 1989 West German film directed by Bernhard Wicki. It is based on the 1923 novel by Joseph Roth. It was chosen as West Germany's official submission to the 62nd Academy Awards for Best Foreign Language Film, but did not manage to receive a nomination. The film was the last submission by West Germany, due to German reunification in 1990, Germany competed at the 63rd Academy Awards as a single country.

The film was also entered into the 1989 Cannes Film Festival.

Plot 
The film centers on young right-wing Leutnant (lieutenant) Theodor Lohse (Ulrich Mühe) who suffers personal and national humiliation during the downfall of the German Empire and the subsequent German Revolution of 1918 as the aftermath of World War I, from whence on he pledges revenge on all those he blames for the new times: Democrats, socialists, and Jews. Thus, he becomes increasingly active in the right-wing underground of the early Weimar Republic, joining an organization called "S II" (probably based on real-life Organisation Consul that was responsible for a number of political and anti-Semitic assassinations) where his immediate superior is Baron von Rastchuk (Armin Mueller-Stahl). Baron von Rastchuk brings Lohse in contact with Prince Heinrich in order to get Lohse employed, a favor for which the homosexual Prince demands one-time bodily obligingness from Lohse. In spite of his apparent shock and disgust, Lohse yields to the Prince out of his opportunism and willingness to please his superiors.

Lohse becomes a full-time spy for the organization, and with unprecedented, relentless opportunism and unscrupulousness he spies in on Communist plots, partakes in the organization's plans to undermine the new German democracy, and disposes of his own right-wing colleagues when he sees fit, all of which to serve his own plans of rising to the top within right-wing circles. During these activities he comes in contact with Benjamin Lenz (Klaus Maria Brandauer), a Jewish man dealing in information on all kinds of criminal and underground political proceedings who will always sell at the highest price, be it paid by left or right-wing conspirators or the police. In spite of Lohse's hatred of Jews, he finds Lenz's services useful, but soon finds himself at his mercy as Lenz through their collaboration finds out more and more about Lohse's schemes and spy activities.

When Lenz learns that Lohse ordered a pogrom of the local Jewish ghetto, he confronts the rather short and slim-built Lohse in private, beating him close to senselessness and almost forces Lohse to commit suicide by jumping out of a window, until he realizes that killing Lohse would not make him any better than the anti-Semite that had ordered the violence in the ghetto. Lohse then has his henchmen murder Lenz, also because he knew too much, by pushing him in front of an approaching train. The film ends in late 1923 with Lohse leaving a festivity of conservatives and monarchists, declaring that restoring the monarchy has by now become "old hat", and with glowing eyes he mentions a "new man" preparing a putsch in Munich to count on - a man named Adolf Hitler.

Cast
 Ulrich Mühe - Theodor Lohse
 Klaus Maria Brandauer - Benjamin Lenz
 Armin Mueller-Stahl - Baron von Rastchuk
 Andrea Jonasson - Rahel Efrussi
 Corinna Kirchhoff - Else von Schlieffen
 Elisabeth Endriss - Anna
 Ullrich Haupt - Baron von Köckwitz
 Agnes Fink - Mutter Lohse
 András Fricsay Kali Son - Klitsche
 Ernst Stötzner - Günter
 Peter Roggisch - Prince Heinrich
 Rolf Henniger - Aaron Efrussi
 Hans Korte - Geheimrat Hugenberg
 Kyra Mladeck - Frau von Köckwitz
 Hark Bohm - Dada-artist

See also
 List of submissions to the 62nd Academy Awards for Best Foreign Language Film
 List of German submissions for the Academy Award for Best Foreign Language Film

References

External links

1989 films
1989 drama films
German drama films
West German films
1980s German-language films
Films based on works by Joseph Roth
Films directed by Bernhard Wicki
Films set in Berlin
Cultural depictions of Adolf Hitler
Films set in 1918
Films set in 1919
Films set in the 1920s
1980s German films